Campanula bravensis is a species of flowering plant in the bellflower family Campanulaceae. The species is endemic to Cape Verde. The specific name bravensis refers to the island of Brava. The species was described by Carl August Bolle, and named by Auguste Chevalier in 1935. Its local name is contra-bruxas-branca ("white against witches").

Distribution and ecology
Campanula jacobaea occurs in the islands of Santiago, Fogo and Brava.

Notes

External links

Auguste Chevalier (1935). Les îles du Cap Vert : géographie, biogéographie, agriculture. Flore de l'archipel, National Historic Natural Museum, Colonial Agronomy Laboratory, Paris

bravensis
Endemic flora of Cape Verde
Flora of Santiago, Cape Verde
Flora of Fogo, Cape Verde
Flora of Brava, Cape Verde